Navicula caddoensis is a fossil species of algae in the genus Navicula. Navicula caddoensis is extinct.

References

Further reading
 

caddoensis
Species described in 1968